Thymus dubjanskyi is a species of flowering plant in the family Lamiaceae, native to central and southern European Russia. It is a specialist on chalky soils.

References

dubjanskyi
Endemic flora of Russia
Flora of Central European Russia
Flora of South European Russia
Plants described in 1931